Ansar Ahmad may refer to:

 Ansar Ahmad (Indian politician), member of the Uttar Pradesh Legislative Assembly
 Ansar Ahmad (Indonesian politician) (born 1964), former regent of Bintan Regency (2005–2015) and member of the People's Representative Council (2019–2020), governor-elect of Riau Islands